Leptopteris fraseri, commonly known as the crepe fern, is a species of plant occurring in eastern Australia. Its habitat is wet places, mostly on the Great Dividing Range. It is found in caves, near waterfalls, in dark shady places in the cooler rainforests.

Description
A fern with a trunk to one metre high, with one or more crowns. The stem may be glaucous. Small reddish-brown hairs may also be seen. Mature sporangia are found under the fronds in irregular patterns, brownish-orange in colour.

References

External links
 

Osmundales
Ferns of Australia
Flora of New South Wales
Flora of Queensland